Manawa can refer to:
Manawa, Wisconsin, a city in Wisconsin
Manawa (crustacean): Manawa Hornibrook, 1949, a genus of ostracod
Manawa Forster, 1970 an invalid genus of spider: now Mesudus Özdikmen, 2007
Manawa Bergquist & Fromont, 1988, an invalid genus of sponge: now Pyloderma Kirkpatrick, 1907
Manawa is the Māori name of the grey mangrove tree, Avicennia marina
Ngā Mānawa, the fire children in Māori mythology
Travis Manawa, fictional character in Fear the Walking Dead
Christopher Manawa, fictional character in Fear the Walking Dead
Liza Manawa, fictional character in Fear the Walking Dead